Coyote Springs is used in several ways including:

Coyote Springs, Nevada
Coyote Springs, New Mexico in Coyote Canyon within the Sandia complex
Coyote Springs, Utah, a Tule Valley spring system used by local wildlife and feral horses.
Coyote Springs Trading Co.
Coyote Springs Cogeneration Project in Oregon
Coyote Springs Elementary School, Dewey, Arizona
Coyote Springs Elementary School, Prescott Valley, Arizona
Springs
Coyote Springs a natural spring in Texas also called Indian Springs